The 1991 England rugby union tour of Australia and Fiji was a series of six matches played by the England national rugby union team in Australia and Fiji in July 1991. The England team won five of their nine matches. England lost their international against the Australia national rugby union team but won the match against the Fiji national rugby union team.

Matches
Scores and results list England's points tally first.

England tour
Rugby union tours of Fiji
England national rugby union team tours of Australia
England
Tour